The 1988 Taranto Open was a women's tennis tournament played on outdoor clay courts in Taranto, Italy and was part of the Category 1 of the 1988 WTA Tour. It was the second edition of the tournament and ran from 26 April until 1 May 1988. Helen Kelesi won the singles title.

Finals

Singles

 Helen Kelesi defeated  Laura Garrone 6–1, 6–0
 It was Kelesi's only title of the year and the 2nd of her career.

Doubles

 Andrea Betzner /  Claudia Porwik defeated  Laura Garrone /  Helen Kelesi 6–1, 6–2
 It was Betzner's only title of the year and the 2nd of her career. It was Porwik's only title of the year and the 1st of her career.

References

External links
 ITF tournament edition details
 Tournament draws

Taranto Open
Ilva Trophy
1988 in Italian tennis
1989 in Italian women's sport